James Cordiner (1775–1836) was a Scottish Episcopal minister and writer, author of A Description of Ceylon.

Life

Origins 
James Cordiner, third son of Charles Cordiner, Episcopal minister of Banff, was born in 1775. He received the first rudiments of education at Banff, and afterwards studied at the University and King's College, Aberdeen, where in an "album" or register of students now in the university library his name appears among those entering the first class in Greek (taught by Professor John Leslie) in the session 1789–1790, and in a roll of "Artium Magistri" of 29 April 1793.

Ceylon 
In 1797 he was appointed to a charge at the Military Orphan Asylum, Madras, and to do duty as chaplain with the 80th Foot, then at Trincomalee, where he remained about 12 months. Thence, at the desire of the governor, Frederick North, afterwards Earl of Guilford, he proceeded to Colombo to do chaplain's duty with the 51st Foot, under orders for that place. He remained in Ceylon as garrison chaplain at Colombo and principal of all the schools in the island, where he was the only Church of England clergyman, up to 1804, when he returned home. On his departure he was presented by the civil and military officials at Colombo with a piece of plate of the value of 210 guineas, as a mark of their attachment and esteem.

Ministry 
On 26 May 1807 Cordiner was appointed by the constituent members of the congregation one of the ministers of St. Paul's Episcopal Church (or chapel as it then was called) at Aberdeen, at a stipend of £70 a year. He appears to have come to them from London on the recommendation of Roderick Macleod of St. Anne's, Soho. The important community of Episcopalians worshipping at St. Paul's Chapel was at that time, as it continued down to 1870 or later, not part of the Scottish Episcopalian Church, but one of those Episcopalian communities claiming connection with the Church of England as distinct from the native nonjuring Episcopalian body.

Death 
After faithfully discharging the duties of the ministry for many years, Cordiner resigned, on account of ill-health, on 13 November 1834, and was granted a retiring annuity of £100, with the chapel-house as a residence. He died of congestion of the lungs on 13 January 1836, in the 61st year of his age and the 37th of his ministry, and was buried in the churchyard of St. Nicholas, Aberdeen, where is a tombstone to his memory.

Family 
He left a widow, who for many years received a small annuity (12 guineas) from the chapel funds, and a son Charles, a clergyman of the Church of Scotland, who down to 1864 or later was Presbyterian minister of Kinnenmouth, a chapel-of-ease in Lonmay parish, Aberdeenshire.

Works 
After his return from Ceylon, Cordiner published A Description of Ceylon, with narratives of a Tour round the Island in 1800, the Expedition to Candy in 1803, and a Visit to Ramasseram in 1804 (London, 1807). From the preface it appears that the author did not accompany the expedition to Kandy, but was furnished with the particulars from official sources. He is therefore not responsible for statements which, as Sir Emerson Tennent has pointed out, when read by the light of Governor North's confidential correspondence, place the authorities in a very regrettable light. The work, which is in two quarto volumes, contains fine plates from original drawings by the author of objects of interest in the island.

Cordiner also wrote A Voyage to India, which was published in 1820.

References

Citations

Bibliography 

  
 Chichester, H. M.; Ritchie, Lionel Alexander (2004). "Cordiner, James (1775–1836)". In Oxford Dictionary of National Biography. Oxford University Press.
 Cordiner, James (1807). A Description of Ceylon. Vol. 1. Vol. 2. London: Longman, Hurst, Rees, and Orme, Paternoster Row; and A. Brown, Aberdeen.
 Tennent, James Emerson (1859). Ceylon: An Account of the Island. 4th ed. Vol. 1. Vol. 2. London: Longman, Green, Longman, and Roberts.

1775 births
1836 deaths
19th-century Scottish Episcopalian priests
Historians of Sri Lanka
People from Banff, Aberdeenshire
Alumni of the University of Aberdeen
British Indian Army chaplains